X14 or X-14 may refer to:
 SJ X14, a series of two-car electric multiple units operated by Statens Järnvägar of Sweden as local trains
 Bell X-14, an experimental VTOL aircraft flown in the United States in the 1950s
 X14 (New York City bus), a bus service
 X-14, a line of hard surface cleaning products from the WD-40 Company

See also 
 14-X, a Brazilian drone aircraft